Plärrer station is the only Nuremberg U-Bahn station apart from Nürnberg Hauptbahnhof to have an interchange with all the U-Bahn lines – the U1, U2, and U3. Like Aufseßplatz, Hauptbahnhof and Friedrich Ebert Platz orange tiles indicate its intended use as an interchange station between different subway main lines. The station is named after the Plärrer, long an important interchange of various types of transportation including the site of the Nuremberg terminus for the Bavarian Ludwig Railway. Despite folk etymology linking the name to the local word "plärren" for screaming, it likely derives from Plarre a now disused word for a square.

References

Nuremberg U-Bahn stations
Railway stations in Germany opened in 1980
1980 establishments in West Germany